Zindagi Badal Sakta Hai Hadsaa was a Hindi television thriller series broadcast on Zee TV, from 9 May to 24 August 2008. It replaced the comedy-drama series Chaldi Da Naam Gaddi, taking its timeslot.

Concept
The concept of Hadsaa is based on real-life events and it shows how one incident (hadsaa) can change peoples' lives forever. The show revolves around a team known as STF — Special Task Force — that helps solve problems and crimes.

The show has episodic stories of crimes. Each episode has an emotional story with a hooker and how that hadsaa changes that story is the main point of the episode. In addition, the purpose of haadsa is to bring to light what the common people probably do not know about the evil people — stories of stolen bread eaters of the family maimed for life, of children orphaned and parents left childless.

Cast 
 Mohan Kapoor ... ACP Manoviraj Singh (Head of STF)
 Karan Oberoi ... Inspector Abhimanyu Singh/Abhi (younger brother of Manoviraj Singh)
 Khalid Siddiqui as Inspector Ekaansh Thakur (deputy head of STF)
 Pooja Bharti ... Inspector Divyanka Chauhan (STF officer from Kashmir's branch)
 Himani Chawla ... Inspector Gurinder Kaur/Garry (STF officer from Punjab's branch)
 Mehul Buch
 Lata Sabharwal
 Mouli Ganguly
 Gautam Chaturvedi
 Mihir Mishra
 Simple Kaul
 Monaz Mevawala
 Kanwaljit Singh
 Mohit Chauhan
 Shruti Ulfat
 Narayani Shastri
 Shraddha Nigam
 Ashish Nayyar

External links 
Official webite

Indian crime television series
Zee TV original programming
2008 Indian television series debuts
2008 Indian television series endings